HD 20781 e is a hot Neptune around the star HD 20781. The planet has a minimum mass of 14.03 Earth masses and it orbits with a semi-major axis of 0.3374 astronomical units and an orbital eccentricity of approximately 0.06. With the same composition as Neptune, it would have a radius of 3.79 times that of the Earth. With the same composition as Earth, it would have a radius of 2.08 times that of the Earth. It orbits near the inner edge of the habitable zone of HD 20781.

This planet was initially reported in a 2011 preprint, which referred to it as HD 20781 c. However, the 2017 paper (published in a journal in 2019) that confirmed the planet designated it HD 20781 e, using the c designation for a different, shorter-period planet.

References

Templates

Exoplanets discovered in 2011
Exoplanets detected by radial velocity
Fornax (constellation)
Hot Neptunes